Adriano Domínguez Fernández (4 January 1919 – 9 May 2008) was a Spanish film and television actor. He appeared in 150 films between 1945 and 1994. He survived to the terrorist act at California 47 café in 1979 by GRAPO. He died on 9 May 2008 at the age of 92 at Virgen del Camino nursing home in León.

Selected filmography

 Mauricio o Una víctima del vicio (1940)
 Last Stand in the Philippines (1945) - Pineda
 The Princess of the Ursines (1947) - Jefe de corchetes
 Doña María la Brava (1948) - Príncipe Don Enrique
 Agustina of Aragon (1950)
 The Lioness of Castille (1951)
 Our Lady of Fatima (1951)
 Séptima página (1951) - Méndez
 Spanish Serenade (1952) - Andrés
 El encuentro (1952)
 Airport (1953) - Mendoza
 The Devil Plays the Flute (1953) - Jacinto
 Flight 971 (1953) - Hijo de la mujer enferma
 Two Paths (1954) - Teniente Ibarra
 High Fashion (1954) - Alfonso
 La patrulla (1954) - Soñador
 Miracle of Marcelino (1955) - Monk
 Nubes de verano
 Historias de la radio (1955)
 Uncle Hyacynth (1956) - Policía
 Horas de pánico (1957)
 El anónimo (1957)
 The Night Heaven Fell (1958) - Fernando
 Carlota (1958)
 Gayarre (1959) - Sabater
 Pasos de angustia (1959)
 Back to the Door (1959) - Fermín
 El indulto (1960) - Sargento Guardia Civil
 Peace Never Comes (1960)
 Alfonso XII and María Cristina (1960)
 Regresa un desconocido (1961) - Amigo de Juan
 The Colossus of Rhodes (1961)
 Plácido (1961)
 Tres de la Cruz Roja (1961)
 The Reprieve (1961)
 El amor de los amores (1962) - Doctor Acevedo
 Cerca de las estrellas (1962) - Antonio
 Teresa de Jesús (1962)
 The Mustard Grain (1962) - Médico
 Las doce sillas (1962)
 Occidente y sabotaje (1962)
 Queen of The Chantecler (1962)
 The Running Man (1963) - Civil Guard
 Tela de araña (1963) - Pinto
 Eva 63 (1963) - Carlos
 El camino (1963) - Dimas
 Aquella joven de blanco (1964) - Francois Soubirous
 La muerte silba un blues (1964) - Comisario Folch
 Jandro (1965) - Suárez
 Dos chicas locas, locas... (1965) - Leopoldo
 El cálido verano del Sr. Rodríguez (1965)
 Un vampiro para dos (1965) - Empleado Casa España Düsseldorf
 Television Stories (1965)
 Balearic Caper (1966)
 Culpable para un delito (1966) - Policía
 Fray Torero (1966) - Médico
 De barro y oro (1966) - Antonio
 I'll Kill Him and Return Alone (1967)
 El rostro del asesino (1967) - Pablo
 Club de solteros (1967)
 Pero... ¿en qué país vivimos? (1967) - Amigo de Antonio en la discográfica
 Cervantes (1967) - (uncredited)
 El turismo es un gran invento (1968) - Secretario del Ministro
 Uno a uno, sin piedad (1968)
 ¡Cómo sois las mujeres! (1968) - Goyo - marido de Julia
 La chica de los anuncios (1968) - Agente publicitario
 No le busques tres pies... (1968)
 Abuelo Made in Spain (1969) - Marido de Visitación
 Bohemios (1969)
 Pecados conyugales (1969) - Vélez
 Las nenas del mini-mini (1969) - Padre de Piluca
 Soltera y madre en la vida (1969) - Un juerguista
 A 45 revoluciones por minuto (1969) - Camarero
 Johnny Ratón (1969)
 Matrimonios separados (1969) - Comisario
 Con ella llegó el amor (1970)
 Golpe de mano (Explosión) (1970) - Teniente médico
 El abominable hombre de la Costa del Sol (1970) - Peña
 Tristana (1970) - Policía
 Los hombres las prefieren viudas (1970) - Luis
 El monumento (1970) - Médico
 Growing Leg, Diminishing Skirt (1970)
 Hembra (1970)
 Vente a Alemania, Pepe (1971) - Don Ramón Benítez
 Las ibéricas F.C. (1971) - Agustín Miranda, el arbitro
 La cera virgen (1972) - Fiscal
 La casa de las Chivas (1972) - Alonso
 Experiencia prematrimonial (1972) - Pepito
 God in Heaven... Arizona on Earth (1972)
 Flor de santidad (1973) - General
 Tarot (1973) - Doctor
 The Guerrilla (1973)
 El padrino y sus ahijadas (1974)
 Proceso a Jesús (1974) - Espectador ciego
 Cinco almohadas para una noche (1974) - Camarero
 Tocata y fuga de Lolita (1974) - Requejo
 Los muertos, la carne y el diablo (1974)
 Largo retorno (1975) - Martin
 La amante perfecta (1976)
 The Legion Like Women (1976)
 Señoritas de uniforme (1976) - Andrés
 Secuestro (1976) - Ramiro
 Sweetly You'll Die Through Love (1977)
 Pepito piscina (1978) - Don Marcelino
 Estimado Sr. juez... (1978) - El comisario
 Venus de fuego (1978)
 Father Cami's Wedding (1979)
 El día del presidente (1979) - Ministro de Trabajo
 Cinco tenedores (1980) - Los Monteros
 El alcalde y la política (1980) - Raimundo
 Los cántabros (1980) - Antistio
 Adiós, querida mamá (1980)
 La vendedora de ropa interior (1982)
 Fredy el croupier (1982) - Director casino
 Old Shirt to New Jacket (1982) - Secretario general de Falange
 Y del seguro... líbranos Señor! (1983)
 Christina y la reconversión sexual (1984) - Policía (uncredited)
 La hoz y el Martínez (1985)
 Una y sonada... (1985) - Gerardo
 Romanza final (Gayarre) (1986)
 Voyage to Nowhere (1986)
 Policía (1987) - Comisario Jefe
 Moros y cristianos (1987) - Rodríguez
 Amanece, que no es poco (1989)
 Mala yerba (1991) - Especulador (final film role)

References

Bibliography 
 Luis Mariano González. Fascismo, kitsch y cine histórico español, 1939-1953. Univ de Castilla La Mancha, 2009.

External links
 

1919 births
2008 deaths
Spanish male film actors
Spanish male television actors
20th-century Spanish male actors